Wild Blood (Sanguepazzo) is an Italian film directed in 2008 by Marco Tullio Giordana.

Plot
This film tells the story of two renowned actors of the Fascist cinema, Luisa Ferida and Osvaldo Valenti, who were supporters of the Italian Social Republic. Accused of collaboration and torture, they were shot by the Partisans on 30 April 1945, after the country was liberated.

The movie was included in the "uncategorized" group at Cannes Film Festival in 2008.

Cast
Luca Zingaretti as Osvaldo Valenti
Monica Bellucci  as  Luisa Ferida
 Alessio Boni as  Golfiero Goffrinni/Taylor
 Maurizio Donadoni as  Vero Marozin 
 Alessandro Di Natale as  Dalmazio 
 Luigi Diberti as  Cardi
 Tresy Taddei as  Irene
 Mattia Sbragia as the film director
 Luigi Lo Cascio as the partisan 
 Sonia Bergamasco as the prisoner

References

External links
 
 
 

2008 films
2000s Italian-language films
2008 biographical drama films
Italian biographical drama films
Films directed by Marco Tullio Giordana
2008 drama films
Films about Fascist Italy
2000s Italian films